Rev. Samuel Kaveto Mbambo (born in Kavango Region) is a Namibian politician, diplomat,
theologian, historian, and academic. He was a governor of the Kavango Region, and after its split into Kavango West and Kavango East, also of these new entities. He also served as ambassador of the Republic of Namibia to the Russian Federation and as Namibia's high commissioner to the Republic of India.

Mbambo was appointed governor of Namibia's Kavango Region in April 2013, succeeding Maurus Nekaro. When the Fourth Delimitation Commission of Namibia, responsible for recommending on the country's administrative divisions suggested in August 2013 to split the Kavango Region into two, creating the new regions of Kavango East and Kavango West, Mbambo was for a few months governor of both. In April 2014 Sirkka Ausiku was appointed governor of Kavango West while Mbambo continued as governor of Kavango East. His term expired in 2020, and he was not reappointed. Mbambo is a long-term SWAPO member and was elected to its central committee in 2021.

Mbambo is a pastor in the Evangelical Reformed Church of Africa and President of the Council of Churches in Namibia.

References 

Year of birth missing (living people)
Living people
SWAPO politicians
Namibian Lutheran clergy
Ambassadors of Namibia to Russia
Ambassadors of Namibia to Ukraine
People from Kavango Region
High Commissioners of Namibia to India